Eliran Kantor (born 13 September 1984) is a Berlin-based artist and illustrator known mostly for creating album covers for metal bands such as Testament, Soulfly, Helloween and My Dying Bride. He created the artwork used on various releases issued via the likes of Universal Music, Nuclear Blast, Metal Blade Records, Relapse Records and Century Media Records among others.

Album cover illustration credits 
Entheos - Time Will Take Us All (Metalblade, 2023)
Malevolence (band) - Malicious Intent (MLVLTD, 2022)
Kreator - Hate Über Alles (Nuclear Blast, 2022)
Archspire - Bleed the Future (Seasons of Mist, 2021)
Helloween - Helloween (Nuclear Blast, 2021)
Testament – Titans of Creation (Nuclear Blast, 2020)
My Dying Bride - The Ghost of Orion (Nuclear Blast, 2020)
Heaven Shall Burn - Of Truth & Sacrifice (Nuclear Blast, 2020)
Hatebreed - Weight of the False Self (Nuclear Blast, 2020)
Havok - V (Century Media, 2020)
Incantation - Sect of Vile Divinities (Relapse, 2020)
Gaerea - Limbo (Season of Mist, 2020)
Loudblast - Manifesto (Listenable Records, 2020)
Venom Prison - Primeval (Prosthetic Records, 2020)
Aversions Crown - Hell Will Come for Us All (Nuclear Blast, 2020)
Thy Art Is Murder – Human Target (Nuclear Blast Records, 2019)
The Wildhearts - Renaissance Men (Graphite Records, 2019)
Andy Black - The Ghost of Ohio (Lava/Republic, 2019)
Despised Icon - Purgatory (Nuclear Blast, 2019)
Venom Prison - Samsara (Prosthetic Records, 2019)
Black Wizard – Livin' Oblivion (Listenable Records, 2018)
Archspire – Relentless Mutation (Seasons of Mist, 2017)
Thy Art Is Murder – Dear Desolation (Nuclear Blast Records, 2017)
Acrania – Fearless (Independent, 2015)
Artizan – The Furthest Reaches – Limited Edition Version (Pure Steel Records, 2015)
 - Wolf's Cry (Pitch Black Records, 2015)
Iced Earth – Plagues of Babylon (Century Media, 2014)
Hammercult – Anthems Of The Damned (Sonic Attack/SPV, 2012)
Artizan – Ancestral Energy (Pure Steel Records, 2013)
Satan – Life Sentence (Listenable Records, 2013)
Dark Sermon –  In Tongues (eOne Music, 2013)
Spheron – Ecstasy of God (Apostasy Records, 2013)
Evile – Skull (Earache Records, 2013)
Hatebreed – The Divinity of Purpose (USA – Razor & Tie, Europe – Nuclear Blast Records, 2013)
Acrania – An Uncertain Collision (Independent, 2012)
Ferium – Reflections (Boxer Studios, 2012)
Testament – Dark Roots of Earth (Nuclear Blast, 2012)
Sigh – In Somniphobia (Candlelight Records, 2012)
Advent of Bedlam – Flesh Over God (Self-Released, 2012)
Sodom – In War and Pieces (SPV Records, 2010)
Atheist – Jupiter (Season Of Mist 2010)
Acrania – Unbreakable Fury (Independent, 2010)
Sigh – Scenes from Hell (The End Records, 2010)
Mekong Delta – Wanderer on the Edge of Time (AAARRG Records, 2010)
Virus – The Agent That Shapes The Desert (Duplicate Records, 2010)
Anacrusis – Hindsight: Suffering Hour & Reason Revisited (Anacrusis, 2010)
Master – The Human Machine (Pulverized Records, 2010)
Enders Game – What We've Lost (Independent release, 2010)
The Crinn – Dreaming Saturn (Nuclear Blast Records, 2010)
Hyperion – Orchestrating The Myth (Independent release, 2010)
Masachist – Death March Fury (Witching Hour Productions, 2009)
The Alien Blakk – Modes of Alienation (Reissue) (Independent release, 2009)
GWAR – Lust in Space (inside sleeve artwork only) (Metal Blade, 2009)
Immortal Dominion – Primortal (427Records, 2009)
Mandala – I (independent release, 2009)
Testament – The Formation of Damnation (Nuclear Blast, 2008)
To-Mera – Delusions (Candlelight Records, 2008)
Baliset – A Time for Rust (Ret-Con records, 2008)
Ansur – Warring Factions (Candlelight Records/Nocturnal Art Production, 2008)
Deceiver – Thrashing Heavy Metal (Pulverised Records, 2008)
Desolation – Lexicon V (Shadowflame Records, 2008)
Xerath – Xerath I (Promotional demo, 2008)
Thy Majestie – Dawn (Dark Balance Records, 2008)
Masachist – Death March Fury (TBA, 2008)
Robot Lords of Tokyo – II: Whiskey, Blood & Napalm (Independent release, 2008)
Prey For Nothing – Violence Divine (Rusty Cage Records, 2008)
Abysmalia – Portals to Psychotic Inertia  (independent release, 2008)
Grant O'neil – Head-On (Independent release, 2008)
Sorrow's Joy – Fallow Ground  (Independent release, 2008)
Liberty N' Justice – 4 All : the best of LNJ (Versallis Records, 2007)
sHeavy – The Machine That Won the War (Candlelight Records, 2007)
Mena Brinno – Icy Muse (Dark Balance Records, 2007)
Thrustor – Night of Fire (Black Bastola Records, 2007)
The Old Dead Tree – The Water Fields (Season of Mist Records, 2007)
Detonation – Emission Phase (Osmose Productions, 2007)
Aghora – Formless (European edition) (Season of Mist Records, 2007)
Denis Vlachiotis – Imperishable Ferocity (Independent release, 2007)
Dissonant – Perspective independent release, 2007)
Mekong Delta – Lurking Fear (AFM Records/Candlelight Records, 2007)
Savannah – S/T (Independent release, 2007)
Sickening Horror – When Landscapes Bleed Backwards (Neurotic Records, 2006)
Aghora – Formless (American edition) (Dobles Music, 2006)
Abed – The Coming of Soon (Independent release, 2005)
Abused Romance – S/T (Independent release, 2005)
Dred – A Pathway to Extinction (Independent release, 2005)
To-Mera – Transcendental (Candlelight Records, 2005)
Bishop of Hexen – The Nightmarish Compositions (SPV Records/CCP Records, 2005)
Armilos – Race of Lies (Independent release, 2004)
Solitary – Trail of Omission (Independent release, 2004)

Book cover illustration credits 
Moshe Peled – Back to the Circuit (Kavim Publishing Inc., 2007)

References

External links
Official homepage
Facebook page
Eliran Kantor on MySpace

1984 births
Album-cover and concert-poster artists
German illustrators
Living people